Penstemon fruticosus is a species of penstemon known by the common names bush penstemon or shrubby penstemon. It is native to the Pacific Northwest of North America from Oregon to British Columbia, and east to the Rocky Mountains of Wyoming, Montana, and Alberta.

Description
The flowers are tubular and pink, lavender, or purple.

Penstemon fruticosus is included in Penstemon subgenus Dasanthera, along with P. barrettiae, P. cardwellii, P. davidsonii, P. ellipticus, P. lyallii, P. montanus, P. newberryi, and P. rupicola.

References

External links

fruticosus
Flora of the Northwestern United States
Flora of British Columbia
Flora of Alberta
Flora of the Cascade Range
Flora of the Rocky Mountains
Flora without expected TNC conservation status